Chris McRae (born August 26, 1965) is a Canadian former professional ice hockey player who played 21 games in the National Hockey League. He played with the Toronto Maple Leafs and Detroit Red Wings. 

As a youth, he played in the 1978 Quebec International Pee-Wee Hockey Tournament with a minor ice hockey team from Thornhill, Ontario. His brother is Basil McRae.

Career statistics

Regular season and playoffs

References

External links

1965 births
Living people
Adirondack Red Wings players
Belleville Bulls players
Canadian ice hockey left wingers
Denver Rangers players
Detroit Red Wings players
Fort Wayne Komets players
Ice hockey people from Ontario
Newmarket Saints players
Oshawa Generals players
People from Brock, Ontario
St. Catharines Saints players
Sudbury Wolves players
Toronto Maple Leafs players
Undrafted National Hockey League players